Dick Cheney (born 1941) is an American politician and businessman who was the vice president of the United States from 2001 to 2009.

Richard Cheney or Richard Cheyney may also refer to:

 Richard Cheney (New Mexico politician) (born 1937), an American politician and a former Republican member of the New Mexico House of Representatives 
 Richard Cheyney (1513–1579), an English bishop of Gloucester